is a railway station on the Hachinohe Line operated by East Japan Railway Company (JR East) in the city of Hachinohe, Aomori Prefecture, Japan.

Lines
Tanesashi-Kaigan Station is served by the Hachinohe Line, and is 19.6 kilometers from the starting point of the line at Hachinohe Station.

Station layout
The station has a single ground-level side platform serving one bi-directional track. The station is unattended.

History
All freight operations were discontinued as of October 1, 1962. The station has been unattended since November 16, 1982. With the privatization of JNR on April 1, 1987, it came under the operational control of JR East. It was renamed Tanesashi-Kaigan Station on December 1, 2002.

Surrounding area
Tanesashi Coast

See also
 List of Railway Stations in Japan

External links

  

Railway stations in Aomori Prefecture
Railway stations in Japan opened in 1924
Hachinohe Line
Hachinohe
Stations of East Japan Railway Company